Scymnus (Pullus) latemaculatus, is a species of lady beetle found in Pakistan, India, Bangladesh, Sri Lanka, Thailand, and Taiwan.

Description
Body length is 1.5 to 2.0 mm. Body long and dark brown in color. Elytra densely pubescent.

Biology
It is a predator of several whiteflies, aphids and scale insects such as Aphis punicae, Aphis craccivora, Brevicoryne brassicae, Lipaphis erysimi, Myzus persicae, Aphis gossypii, Hyadaphis coriandri, Hysteroneura setariae, Rhopalosiphum maidis, Therioaphis trifolii, Macrosiphum granarium, Schizaphis graminum, Phenacoccus solenopsis, Ferrisia virgata, Dactylopius opuntiae, Drosicha mangiferae, Amrasca devastans, Amrasca biguttula, Bemisia tabaci and Tetranychus atlanticus.

Host plants of the beetle include: mustard, lucerne, cabbage, cauliflower, potato, turnip, bottle gourd, brinjal, okra, wheat, cotton, and rose.

References

Coccinellidae
Insects of Sri Lanka
Beetles described in 1858